Nowy Sącz or Sanz, a town in Poland
Sanz (Hof I, III, IV, V, VI, VII), part of Groß Kiesow, Germany
Sanz (surname)
Kiryat Sanz (disambiguation) 
Sanz, a Hasidic dynasty originating in the city of Sanz
Sanz, a 2021 album released by Alejandro Sanz.